Yangjae (Seocho-gu Office) Station is a station on the Seoul Subway Line 3 and Shinbundang Line. It was the southern terminus of Line 3 until October 30, 1993, when the line was extended to Suseo station, and it became a transfer station with the Shinbundang Line on October 28, 2011. It is located in Yangjae-dong, Seocho and Gangnam District, Seoul.

It serves as an important mass transit hub for commuters who travel between Seoul and suburban cities such as Bundang, Yongin, and Suwon.

Station layout

Vicinity

Exit 1 : Hanjin Art Center
Exit 2 : Yeongdong Middle School, Woosung APT
Exit 3 : Eungseong Middle & Eungwang girls'High Schools
Exit 4 : Eonju Elementary School
Exit 5 : Seocho Social Welfare Center
Exit 6 : Yangjae Il(1)-Dong
Exit 7 : Korean Educational Development Institute (KEDI)
Exit 8 : Seocho District Office, Yangjae High School, Institute of Foreign Affairs & National Security

Nearby Areas of Interest

Citizens' Forest
Yangjae Citizens' Forest is located near Yangjae Tollgate on the Gyeongbu Expressway, the entrance to Seoul City. Built for the 1986 Asian Games and 1988 Seoul Olympics, the land was prepared on July 1983 as part of Gaepo-dong Land Arrangement Plan. The construction of the Forest continued for about three years and completed on November 1986. The total area is 358,992 sq. meters. The park's major facilities include landscaped facilities, such as Grass Field, Octagonal Pavilion, and Pagora (wisteria trellis). The Forest also has sports facilities, such as tennis and basketball courts. Other major structures in the Forest include the Memorial Hall for Patriot Yun Bonggil, a parking lot, children's playground, and an outdoor wedding hall.

Location: 236, Yangjae 2-dong
Admission: Free
Parking: capacity for 571 cars
Yangjae station exit 7, 20 minutes walk or transfer to bus (get off at Yangjae Citizens' Forest).
Yangjae Citizens' Forest

Yangjaecheon
Yangjaecheon is a 5.5 km long body of water that stretches from Gwanak-san through the southern area of Gangnam-gu. There are two swimming areas for kids, a number of stepping stone bridges to cross, and two sites for an ecosystem watch.

Yangjae station exit 7, 18 minutes walk.
Yangjae Stream

Gallery

References 

Metro stations in Seocho District
Seoul Metropolitan Subway stations
Railway stations in South Korea opened in 1985
Seoul Subway Line 3
Shinbundang Line